King of Cowards is the second studio album by British stoner metal band Pigs Pigs Pigs Pigs Pigs Pigs Pigs. The album was released on 28 September 2018 through Rocket Recordings.

Track listing

Critical reception 

King of Cowards was well received by contemporary music critics. On review aggregator website, Metacritic, King of Cowards has an average rating of 80 out of 100 indicating "generally favorable reviews based on 10 critics". On Album of the Year, King of Cowards has an average rating of 79 out of 100 based on six critic reviews.

References

External links 
 King of Cowards at Bandcamp
 

2018 albums
Pigs Pigs Pigs Pigs Pigs Pigs Pigs albums